Paramelia is a genus of leafhoppers belonging to the family Cicadellidae subfamily Deltocephalinae from the Malagasy region.

Species
Some species of this genus are:
 Paramelia colorata
 Paramelia pallida Evans 1954
 Paramelia typica Evans 1954

References
 Evans, 1954. Mémoires de l'Institut scientifique de Madagascar, (E) 4, 125.

Insects of Madagascar
Cicadellidae genera
Scaphoideini